This is a table chart of the current governors of Afghanistan. Provincial governors are all appointed by the supreme leader of Afghanistan.

Governors

See also
 List of current provincial deputy governors in Afghanistan
 List of current provincial police chiefs in Afghanistan
 List of current provincial judges in Afghanistan

References

Main
Governors
Afghanistan,Governors
People of the Islamic Republic of Afghanistan